WeVideo is an online, cloud-based video editing platform that works in web browsers and on mobile devices (Android and iOS). The company was originally founded in 2011 in Europe, their main headquarters is in Mountain View, California with a team based in Romania.

History
WeVideo Inc. was founded under the name of Creaza, Inc., an online creative toolbox used by children throughout Europe. WeVideo publicly launched its services in September 2011, changing its name to avoid any confusion with Creaza Education.

Services 
WeVideo offers subscription-based services for video editing to both commercial and educational markets.

References

External links
 

Video editing software
Cloud applications
IOS software
Android (operating system) software
Software companies based in the San Francisco Bay Area
Software companies established in 2011
2011 establishments in California
Software companies of the United States
Companies based in Mountain View, California